Zhu Aiwen (born 22 September 1994), also known as Angelina Zhu, is a Chinese former tennis player.

Zhu has a career-high doubles ranking of 395 by the WTA, achieved on 12 May 2014. She won three doubles titles at tournaments of the ITF Circuit.

Zhu made her WTA Tour main-draw debut at the 2016 Jiangxi International Women's Tennis Open, in the doubles event partnering Sun Ziyue.

ITF finals

Doubles (3–4)

External links
 
 

1994 births
Living people
Chinese female tennis players
Sportspeople from Wuxi
Tennis players from Jiangsu
21st-century Chinese women